Pleasant Lake is an unincorporated community in Jackson County in the U.S. state of Michigan.  The community is located in Henrietta Township just south of the lake of the same name. Pleasant Lake has a post office with the ZIP Code 49272. In addition to the post office, there is a party store, gas station, a Dollar General, an Independent Bank, an Inn, a golf course/ restaurant, and Christ Episcopal Church.

History
Pleasant Lake was originally known as Spring Lake until John Wenstren renamed the community in 1836. The community was platted in 1868. A post office opened in Pleasant Lake on October 13, 1961; Leo E. Osterberg was its first postmaster.

References

Unincorporated communities in Jackson County, Michigan
Unincorporated communities in Michigan
Populated places established in 1868
1868 establishments in Michigan